This list is a compilation of total centuries scored by international cricketers, split between different formats of the game.

A qualification of 15 overall centuries is used for entry onto the men's list. To date, 124 cricketers have scored 15 or more international centuries, 82 of whom went on to score 20 or more centuries. 43 have scored 30 or more centuries and 21 have a total of 40 or more centuries. Across all three formats, eight players have scored 50 or more centuries, five have scored 60 or more centuries and three have scored 70 or more centuries in their respective international careers.

Five centuries is used as the qualifying standard for the women's list; to date, 24 players have reached this mark.

Key

Men's international cricket 

Source: ESPNcricinfo

Last updated: 21 March 2023

Women's international cricket 

Source: ESPNcricinfo

Last updated: 18 December 2022

See also 

 List of cricketers with centuries in all international formats

References 

Lists of cricketers
Cricket records and statistics